Asura russula is a moth of the family Erebidae. It was described by Sergius G. Kiriakoff in 1963. It is found in the Democratic Republic of the Congo.

References

Moths described in 1963
russula
Insects of the Democratic Republic of the Congo
Moths of Africa
Endemic fauna of the Democratic Republic of the Congo